New Electric Music is the eighth album by New Zealand noise rock band The Dead C, released in 2002 through Language Recordings.

Track listing

Personnel 
The Dead C – production
Michael Morley – instruments
Bruce Russell – instruments
Robbie Yeats – instruments

References

2002 albums
The Dead C albums